The men's competition in 105 kg division was staged on September 24–25, 2007.

Schedule

Medalists

Records

Results

References
Results 

Men's 105